The 2015 Individual Speedway Australian Championship is a Motorcycle speedway competition organised by Motorcycling Australia (MA) for the Australian Solo Championship.

The four round series were held between 3 January and 10 January. In a change to the series points system, riders will score points from the "A" Finals which will count towards their overall series total. A Final points are: 4 points (1st), 3 points (2nd), 2 points (3rd) and 1 point (4th).

The rounds were held at the Gillman Speedway in Adelaide on 3 January, Olympic Park Speedway in Mildura on 5 January, Undera Park Speedway in Undera on 7 January, with the fourth and final round to be held at the Loxford Park Speedway in Kurri Kurri on 10 January.

Qualification
Due to a number of injuries, the official qualifying round to be held at Gillman on 2 January (the day before the championship officially began) was cancelled. This led to MA selecting 16 riders to contest the championship rounds.

The 16 riders seeded through to the finals were:
 Jake Allen (Qld)
 Josh Coyne (Qld)
 Jason Doyle (NSW)
 Jack Fallon (Vic)
 Max Fricke (Vic)
 Josh Grajczonek (Qld)
 Chris Holder (NSW)
 Jack Holder (NSW)
 Sam Masters (NSW)
 Tyson Nelson (Qld)
 Dakota North (Vic)
 Joe Ringwood (NSW)
 Justin Sedgmen (Vic)
 Kieran Sproule (NSW)
 Rohan Tungate (NSW)
 Brodie Waters (Vic)

The reserves were announced as Jordan Stewart (Vic), Cooper Riordan (Vic) and Brady Webb (WA)

Gillman
 Round one
 3 January
  Adelaide, South Australia - Gillman Speedway
 Referee:
 Top 3 riders to "A" Final, riders 4-7 to "B" Final
 "B" Final winner to "A" Final

Gillman "B" Final
1 - Justin Sedgmen
2 - Max Fricke
3 - Chris Holder
4 - Josh Grajczonek

Gillman "A" Final
1 - Jason Doyle
2 - Justin Sedgmen
3 - Rohan Tungate
4 - Dakota North

Olympic Park
 Round two
 5 January
  Mildura, Victoria - Olympic Park Speedway
 Referee:
 Top 3 riders to "A" Final, riders 4-7 to "B" Final
 "B" Final winner to "A" Final

Olympic Park "B" Final
1 - Tyson Nelson
2 - Josh Grajczonek
3 - Max Fricke
4 - Sam Masters

Olympic Park "A" Final
1 - Jason Doyle
2 - Chris Holder
3 - Justin Sedgmen
4 - Tyson Nelson

Undera Park
 Round three
 7 January
  Undera, Victoria - Undera Park Speedway
 Referee:
 Top 3 riders to "A" Final, riders 4-7 to "B" Final
 "B" Final winner to "A" Final

Undera Park "B" Final
1 - Dakota North
2 - Rohan Tungate
Fx - Tyson Nelson
X - Justin Sedgmen

Undera Park "A" Final
1 - Sam Masters
2 - Max Fricke
3 - Jason Doyle
4 - Dakota North

Loxford Park
 Round four
 10 January
  Kurri Kurri, New South Wales - Loxford Park Speedway
 Referee:
 Top 3 riders to "A" Final, riders 4-7 to "B" Final
 "B" Final winner to "A" Final

Loxford Park "B" Final
1 - Dakota North
2 - Jack Holder
3 - Justin Sedgmen
x - Max Fricke

Loxford Park "A" Final
1 - Jason Doyle
2 - Sam Masters
3 - Rohan Tungate
4 - Dakota North

Intermediate classification

Notes

References

See also
 Australian Individual Speedway Championship
 Australia national speedway team
 Sports in Australia

Australia
Speedway in Australia